The 2004–05 Los Angeles Lakers season was the 57th season of the franchise in the National Basketball Association (NBA), and 45th in the city of Los Angeles. The previous season had ended with a crushing defeat in five games to the Detroit Pistons in the 2004 NBA Finals, despite the Lakers being heavily favored. The 2004–05 season is best remembered as a tough one for the Lakers, winning only 34 games and missing the playoffs for the first time in 11 years. It was also the Lakers first season since 1995-96 without either center Shaquille O'Neal, who was traded to the Miami Heat for Lamar Odom, Caron Butler, Brian Grant, and future draft picks, or point guard Derek Fisher (who had signed a six year free agent contract with the Golden State Warriors), two instrumental players to the Lakers' previous three championship victories. The Lakers had the worst team defensive rating in the NBA.

Phil Jackson was also fired in the offseason and replaced by former Houston Rockets head coach Rudy Tomjanovich. However, in February 2005, Tomjanovich's struggle with bladder cancer has been diagnosed since 2003 and forced him to resign after an 24–19 start into the season and be replaced by Jackson's assistant coach Frank Hamblen for the rest of the season. Following the season, Butler was traded to the Washington Wizards, Hamblen was fired as head coach and Vlade Divac retired.

For this season, the Lakers slightly changed their uniforms added the secondary logo to their shorts they remained in used until 2018.

The Lakers would not miss the playoffs again until 2014. This was the first team since the 1998–99 Chicago Bulls and last until the 2014–15 Miami Heat to miss the playoffs after making a Finals appearance as well as the last until the 2014–15 Heat to miss the playoffs after losing the previous year's Finals.

Draft picks

Roster

Player Salaries

Regular season

Season standings

Record vs. opponents

Game log

October 16
Los Angeles Lakers 98
Seattle SuperSonics 85

Player statistics

Awards and records
Kobe Bryant, All-NBA Third Team

Transactions
Kareem Rush was traded to the Charlotte Bobcats on December 6, 2004, for a 2005 2nd round draft pick and a 2009 2nd round draft pick.

References

Los Angeles Lakers seasons
Los Angle
Los Angle
Los Angle